The Red Lion is a disused public house on Soho Road, in the Handsworth district of Birmingham, England.

A pub has stood on the site since 1829. The then building was purchased by the Holt Brewery in 1893 and the current building was erected for them in 1901 by the local architects James and Lister Lea. It was taken over by Ansells on their acquisition of Holt in 1934.

The three-storey building, in brick with a brick and two-tone terracotta facade, a Welsh slate roof and a polygonal corner tower surmounted by a cupola., was granted grade II listed protection in January 1985.

Having closed in 2008, the pub was put up for auction in October 2014, but failed to sell. , it is unused, and is considered "at risk" by the Campaign for Real Ale (CAMRA), and by Historic England, who placed it on their Heritage at Risk Register for 2015. It retains what CAMRA have described as:

Notes

References 

Grade II* listed pubs in Birmingham
Pubs in Birmingham, West Midlands
Buildings and structures completed in 1901
Handsworth, West Midlands